Măgureni is a commune in Prahova County, Muntenia, Romania. It is composed of three villages: Cocorăștii Caplii, Lunca Prahovei and Măgureni. At the 2002 census, 6,630 inhabitants were counted, all but three of whom were ethnic Romanians. 97.3% of inhabitants were Romanian Orthodox, and 2.6% were Adventist.

Natives
Justin Capră (1933–2015), engineer and inventor

References

Communes in Prahova County
Localities in Muntenia